Kyung-wan, also spelled Kyung-oan, is a Korean unisex given name, predominantly masculine. The meaning of the name differs based on the hanja used for each syllable. Regulations of the Supreme Court of Korea permit the following hanja to be registered for use in names:

Kyung (70 hanja):    
Wan (31 hanja):   

People with this name include:

Park Kyung-oan (born 1972), South Korean male baseball catcher
Lim Gyoung-wan (born 1975), South Korean male baseball pitcher
Jeongyeon (born Yoo Kyung-wan, 1996), South Korean female singer, member of Twice

Fictional characters with this name include:
Lee Kyung-wan, male supporting character in 2011 South Korean television series City Hunter
Jang Kyung-wan, male supporting character in 2016 South Korean television series The Promise
Park Kyung-wan, male supporting character in 2017 South Korean television series Stranger

See also
List of Korean given names

References

Korean masculine given names